Gregory Polan (born January 2, 1950) is an American Benedictine monk, priest, abbot, scripture scholar, musician, and author. He is a member of Conception Abbey located in Conception, Missouri, which is part of the Swiss-American Congregation and the Benedictine Confederation. He was previously elected and served as the ninth abbot of Conception Abbey. He presently serves as the tenth Abbot Primate of the Order of St. Benedict, residing at Sant'Anselmo all'Aventino in Rome.

Biography

Early life
John Polan (known by his family as "Jack") was born on 2 January 1950 in Berwyn, Illinois, USA, to Edward and Martha Rita (née Kasperski) Polan; he has two brothers. He began attending St. Mary's grade school in Riverside, Illinois, followed by the minor seminary of Archbishop Quigley Preparatory Seminary in the Archdiocese of Chicago. Polan made a visit to Conception Abbey in Missouri to explore a call to the Benedictine monastic way of life.

Monastic life
Polan entered the novitiate of Conception Abbey in 1970 and made his religious profession as a monk on 28 August 1971, being given the name of "Gregory." He continued further studies in Philosophy and Theology and completed his M.A. in Theology 1975 at St. John's School of Theology. He was ordained a priest on 26 May 1977. After returning to his home abbey for a short period of pastoral work and teaching, he was later assigned to Saint Paul University in Ottawa, Canada, to complete further studies in biblical exegesis. In 1984 he received his Ph.D. in Sacred Scripture with his dissertation entitled "In the ways of justice toward salvation: a rhetorical analysis of Isaiah 56-59."

Upon returning to Conception Abbey, he began teaching in the Abbey's College Seminary (Scripture, Hebrew, Greek, Liturgy, Music) and served for ten years as President-Rector of the College Seminary. On 6 November 1996 he was elected the ninth abbot of Conception Abbey. During his time as abbot he continued work in teaching, offering retreats, assisting with translations of the New American Bible, and serving as a consultant to the United States Conference of Catholic Bishops.

Polan was brought to the larger public attention on 11 June 2002 when he had to serve as the spokesperson for the Abbey following a tragedy. A gunman carrying an assault rifle entered the abbey killing two monks and injuring another two monks. The gunman subsequently killed himself in the encounter with police; a motive for the gunman's actions was never made clear.

Polan is a translator of liturgical texts. A project to revise the Grail Psalms translation began in 1998 and received final approval from the Vatican in 2018. In additional to his contribution to the Grail initiative, he was also involved with the revised Liturgy of the Hours, the Lectionary, the New American Bible, and the Roman Missal.

On 16 September 2016 Polan was elected the Abbot Primate of the Order of St. Benedict and the Benedictine Confederation. The office of Abbot Primate was created by Pope Leo XIII in 1893 to serve the Benedictine monastic community as its liaison to the Vatican and civil authorities, to promote unity among the various autonomous Benedictine monasteries and congregations, and to represent the order at religious gatherings around the globe. He serves as abbot of the Primatial Abbey of Sant'Anselmo, the grand Chancellor of the Pontifical University of Saint Anselm, and oversees the College of Sant'Anselmo in his appointment of its prior and rector. Polan is the tenth Abbot Primate and the fourth American to be elected.

Selected bibliography
 In the ways of justice toward salvation: a rhetorical analysis of Isaiah 56-59, New York: Peter Lang 1986
 The Revised Grail Psalms: a liturgical Psalter, with Frances E. George, Collegeville: Liturgical Press 2012
 The Psalms songs of faith and praise: the Revised Grail Psalter with commentary and prayers, Mahwah: Paulist Press 2014
 Die Psalmen: Impulse zu den ältesten Gebeten der Bibel: der Münsterschwarzacher Psalter, with Matthias Hofmann (in German), Münsterschwarzach: Vier-Türme-Verlag 2020
 Compositions of Gregory J. Polan at Hymnary.org
 as well as numerous articles, book reviews, conferences, lectures, and videos

References

External links
 The Benedictine Confederation of Congregations of Monasteries of the Order of Saint Benedict (official website)
 International Atlas of Benedictine Monasteries
 Collegio Sant'Anselmo (in Italian and English)
 Pontificio Ateneo Sant'Anselmo (in Italian and English)
 Chiesa Sant'Anselmo (in Italian and English)
 Conception Abbey (in English)

1950 births
Living people
Abbots Primate
Benedictine abbots
21st-century Roman Catholic theologians
American abbots
American Benedictines